KCAM is a religious formatted broadcast radio station licensed to Glennallen, Alaska, serving Copper River Valley.  KCAM is owned and operated by Joy Media Ministries.

History
On April 16, 1964, KCAM signed on the air for the first time just weeks after the 1964 Alaska earthquake.  At the time of the station's launch, KCAM was owned by Central Alaska Missions, Inc., which later became a subsidiary of SEND International.  From 2011 to 2015, the station was owned and operated by Alaska Bible College.

References

External links
 790 KCAM Online
 FCC History Cards for KCAM

1964 establishments in Alaska
Radio stations established in 1964
CAM
Copper River Census Area, Alaska